Credito Fondiario may refer to the following banks which was specializing in housing mortgage:
 Credito Fondiario (Fonspa), an Italian bank specialized in management of non-performing loans 
 Istituto Italiano di Credito Fondiario, known as Italfondiario, a subsidiary of doBank
 Istituto di Credito Fondiario delle Venezie, now known as doBank

 Istituto di Credito Fondiario delle Marche, Umbria, Abruzzo e Molise, a defunct bank serving Marche, Umbria, Abruzzo and Molise
 Istituto di Credito Fondiario della Liguria, a defunct bank serving Liguria
 Credito Fondiario Toscano, a defunct bank serving Tuscany